Francis Woodward (22 June 1846 – 14 September 1905) was an Australian politician.

He was born in Goulburn to storekeeper James Woodward and his wife Christina. A solicitor who practised in Wollongong, he married Emily Mary Ann Allen on 9 March 1871; they had eight children. In 1887 he was elected to the New South Wales Legislative Assembly as the Free Trade member for Illawarra. He was re-elected in 1889 but did not contest the 1891 election. Woodward died at Newtown in 1905.

References

 

1846 births
1905 deaths
Members of the New South Wales Legislative Assembly
Free Trade Party politicians
19th-century Australian politicians